Basketball at the 1963 South Pacific Games was played at Suva in Fiji with 6 teams competing in the men's tournament.

Medal summary

Men's tournament

Standings
Final standings after the round robin tournament:

Matches

Play-off for bronze medal

Papua New Guinea defeated Nauru, to win the bronze medal in extra time.

See also
Basketball at the Pacific Games

References

1963 Pacific Games
1963
Pacific